Andreas Amundsen (born 28 December 1980) is a Norwegian jazz bassist.

Career 
Amundsen was born on the island of Senja, Norway. He attended the Jazz program at Trondheim Musikkonservatorium (2004–06), but did not graduate. He is distinguished for a European style in his musical expression.

He has performed with "North" the quartet of Håvard Stubø, with Tore Johansen Quartet, in a quartet with Ed Thigpen, Espen Reinertsen's "Platoon", and at the Trondheim Jazz Festival, 2005, with John Pål Inderberg and Erling Aksdal.

In the summer of 2013, he played at the club "Herr Nilsen" together with Einar "Pastor'n" Iversen (piano), Staffan William-Olsson (guitar) and Andreas Bye (drums).

Discography 
2006: Slant of Light (Jazzaway Records), within "Eyewaterlillies»
2012: Det E'kke Bra Før Det Er Dårlig (Me Records), within "Meg og Kammeraten Min»

References

External links 
Andreas Amundsen Biography at JazzOrakel.no
Andreas Amundsen Biography at Groove.no

1980 births
Living people
Norwegian jazz upright-bassists
Male double-bassists
Jazz double-bassists
Norwegian University of Science and Technology alumni
Musicians from Senja
21st-century double-bassists
21st-century Norwegian male musicians
Male jazz musicians